Antti Mäkijärvi (born 8 December 1993) is a Finnish professional football midfielder who plays for Ykkönen side KTP. Previously, he played in German Regionalliga Nord side VfB Oldenburg. Mäkijärvi was born in Espoo, Finland. He began his senior club career playing for Pallohonka, before making his league debut for Honka at age 17 in 2011. After winning his first trophy, the Finnish League Cup, during his first season on league level, he helped Honka win the 2012 Cup.

Club career

Honka

Mäkijärvi started his Veikkausliiga career in local team FC Honka in 2011.

Ilves

On 14 April 2015, Mäkijärvi signed for FC Ilves on a one-year contract.

Oldenburg

On 10 August 2015 it was announced that Mäkijärvi had signed a contract with VfB Oldenburg.

Return to Honka

On 1 April 2018, Mäkijärvi signed a 1+1 year contract with Honka.

International career 

Mäkijärvi has 40 caps for Finland national youth teams. He made his debut in the UEFA European Under-21 Championship qualifications in Raatti Stadium, Oulu on 11 June 2013 in a match against Lithuania.

Career statistics

Club

Honours and achievements

Club
Honka
Finnish League Cup: 2011
Finnish Cup: 2012

References

  Profile at veikkausliiga.com

External links

 
 
 

1993 births
Living people
Finnish footballers
Finnish expatriate footballers
Veikkausliiga players
Kakkonen players
Ykkönen players
Regionalliga players
Pallohonka players
FC Honka players
VfB Oldenburg players
FC Ilves players
Kotkan Työväen Palloilijat players
Association football midfielders
Finland youth international footballers
Finnish expatriate sportspeople in Germany
Expatriate footballers in Germany
Footballers from Espoo